Lava is a 2014 American computer-animated musical short film produced by Pixar Animation Studios. Directed and written by James Ford Murphy and produced by Andrea Warren, it premiered at the Hiroshima International Animation Festival on June 14, 2014, and was theatrically released alongside Pixar's Inside Out, on June 19, 2015.

The short is a musical love story that takes place over millions of years. It is set to a song (also called "Lava") written by Murphy, and was inspired by the "isolated beauty of tropical islands and the explosive allure of ocean volcanoes." In an interview with Honolulu-based KHON-TV, Murphy explained that his interest in Hawaii began 25 years prior while honeymooning on the main island of Hawai'i. Shortly before the film production had begun, Murphy went back to Hawaii in order to "reconnect emotionally" with the land that sprung his inspiration.

Years later, he heard Israel Kamakawiwoʻole's rendition of "Somewhere Over the Rainbow/What a Wonderful World", which touched him. "I put together this fascination and love and this experience I had with my wife in Hawaii, with this feeling I had for this song and thought, wow, if I could blend those two things, it would be really—a film I would love to see."

The idea began to coalesce while attending the wedding of his sister, who married at the age of 43. "As my sister stood up on the altar, I thought about how happy she was and how long she'd waited for her very special day. There, at my sister’s wedding, I remembered Loihi and I had an epiphany... What if my sister was a volcano? And what if volcanoes spend their entire lives searching for love, like humans do?" Lava is unique in that it lacks any verbal communication other than the song.

Plot
On a tropical island in the Pacific Ocean, a lonely volcano watches the wildlife creatures frolic with their mates and wishes to find one of his own. He sings a song to the ocean each day for thousands of years, gradually venting his lava and sinking into the water, but does not realize that an undersea female volcano has heard him every day and has fallen in love with him.

She emerges on the day when the male volcano becomes almost extinct, but her face is turned away and she cannot see him. He sinks fully into the ocean, heartbroken, but revives when he hears her singing his song to him. His fire reignited, he erupts back to the surface alongside her, and the two merge to form a single island so they can sing together.

Production 
Before creating "Lava," the director, James Ford Murphy, identified characteristics in which he wanted Lava to mimic. These desired characteristics came from 5 other Disney Pixar Shorts that Murphy revealed:

 "Knick Knack" (1989)
 "For the Birds" (2000)
 "Partly Cloudy" (2009)
 "Day & Night" (2010)
 "La Luna" (2011)

Cast
Kuana Torres Kahele as Uku, a lonely volcano searching for his true love. His face is an amalgamation of the faces of Kahele, Israel "IZ" Kamakawiwoʻole, The Honeymooners star Jackie Gleason and the bulldog Marc Antony from the Chuck Jones animated short film Feed the Kitty.
Nāpua Greig as Lele, a volcano and Uku's love interest.

Crew 
The production of the film took an entire year and required a 100-person crew.

Reception

Critical response 
The short had mixed reviews.

Nicholas Garrett gave the short a positive review; he said that "it is one of their most touching and subtle (shorts)". Oliver Lyttelton said that it was "beautiful". Pat Mullen gave the short 5 stars out of 5, praising its "fantastic visuals" and its "overall originality and artistry". Nelson Rivera said "The story is told musically, which is always exciting, because music can really get to core emotions and Lava most certainly achieves this, almost effortlessly".

However, Pablo Ruiz gave a negative review, describing its storytelling as "lazy" and arguing that "there's no character growth, no arc. There's no story. It's just things happening on screen." Michael Colan ranked Lava as one of Pixar's weakest short films based on the writing, saying it has "too much telling, not enough showing". He praised the short film for its "gorgeous animation", however, and thought that it had a "good idea."

Accolades 
The short film "Lava" appeared at both the Telluride and Hiroshima film festivals.

Song
The song to the short, also titled "Lava", was released on June 16, 2015, as a digital single, and as a bonus track on the CD release of Inside Outs soundtrack.

See also 

 List of Pixar shorts

References

External links

2014 films
2014 3D films
2014 fantasy films
2014 computer-animated films
2010s musical fantasy films
American 3D films
Computer-animated short films
American children's animated musical films
American children's animated fantasy films
3D animated short films
Films about volcanoes
Films set in Hawaii
Animated films set on islands
2010s Disney animated short films
Pixar short films
2010s English-language films